Polukhin is a Russian masculine surname, its feminine counterpart is Polukhina. It may refer to
Alexander Polukhin (born 1988), Russian ice hockey player
Nikolay Polukhin (born 1982), Russian Paralympic cross-country skier and biathlete 
Valentina Polukhina (born 1936), British-Russian scholar
Vladimir Polukhin (1932–2009), Russian scientist and engineer 

Russian-language surnames